Abdullahi Lugbuur was the ninth president of the Somali Region of Ethiopia. He took office in October 2005 and left office in November 2008. The fact he spent more than three years in office means he was the longest-serving president of the regional state in the first two decades of its creation.

References

21st-century Ethiopian politicians
Living people
Presidents of Somali Region
Year of birth missing (living people)
Place of birth missing (living people)